The American University of Puerto Rico (AUPR) is a private university in Puerto Rico with campuses in Bayamón and Manatí. The university was founded in 1963 as the American Business College, and offers undergraduate studies in arts, business administration, education, and sciences, and graduate studies in criminal justice.

AUPR is accredited by the Council of Higher Education of Puerto Rico and the Middle States Association of Colleges and Schools.

Its founder, Juan B. Nazario Negrón presided over the University for 48 years and died in 2011.

See also

 Education in Puerto Rico

References

External links
 aupr.edu - official site, in Spanish.

Universities and colleges in Puerto Rico
Liga Atletica Interuniversitaria de Puerto Rico
Educational institutions established in 1963
1963 establishments in Puerto Rico